The 2022 Oakland mayoral election was held on November 8, 2022, to elect the mayor of Oakland, California. The previous incumbent mayor Libby Schaaf was term-limited. Sheng Thao won the election and was inaugurated as mayor in January 2023.

The position is non-partisan. The election was held using instant-runoff voting, the rules of which include voters ranking their top 5 candidates. If one candidate receives a majority (greater than 50%) of the #1 ranked votes, they win the election, but if no candidate meets that criteria, then the candidates with the lowest votes are eliminated and tallying continues to the #2 ranking, and so on until a single candidate receives a majority of votes. Following election day, ballot tallying showed that no candidate received the minimum >50% of the vote necessary to win outright. The two candidates with the most #1 ranked votes were Councilmember Loren Taylor and Councilmember Sheng Thao, with Taylor receiving slightly more votes. Vote tallying continued for over a week, before Thao was eventually declared winner on November 21. The final tally, after rank tallying, had Thao with 50.3% of the 113,636 votes and Taylor with 49.7%.

Candidates
Ignacio De La Fuente, former city councilor from the 5th district and candidate for mayor in 1998 and 2006
Greg Hodge, former school board member
Tyron Jordan, paralegal
Peter Liu, entrepreneur and perennial candidate
Treva Reid, city councilor from the 7th district
John Reimann, retired carpenter and Carpenters Local 713 secretary
Seneca Scott, housing activist
Loren Taylor, city councilor from the 6th district
Sheng Thao, city councilor from the 4th district
Allyssa Victory, labor union attorney

Disqualified 
 Derrick Soo
 Monesha “MJ” Carter

Endorsements

References

Oakland
2022
Oakland
2020s in Oakland, California